The Arnoldus Brumby House is a historic house in Marietta, Georgia, United States. It was built in the Antebellum Era for a West Point graduate and Confederate colonel. It is listed on the National Register of Historic Places.

History
The house was built in 1851 for Colonel Arnoldus Brumby, a graduate of the United States Military Academy in West Point, New York. During the American Civil War of 1861–1865, Brumby served as a colonel in the Confederate States Army (CSA). The house was subsequently purchased by Ellan M. Bradley.

Architectural significance
The house was designed in the Greek Revival architectural style, with Egyptian Revival features. It has been listed on the National Register of Historic Places since August 29, 1977.

References

Houses in Cobb County, Georgia	
National Register of Historic Places in Cobb County, Georgia
Greek Revival architecture in Georgia (U.S. state)
Houses completed in 1851